Stuart McDonald (born March 15, 1931) is an American cartoonist. He was the editorial cartoonist for the Sunday edition of the Grand Forks Herald from 1961 to 1967. His cartoons also appeared in the North Dakotan, a publication of the Greater North Dakota Association, from 1965 to 1968.

Stuart McDonald was born in Grand Forks, North Dakota. He graduated from Grand Forks Central High School in 1949. He attended the University of North Dakota for two years, before entering the United States Air Force in 1951. Following his return, he became vice-president of the McDonald Clothing Company, located in Grand Forks. 
  
The only regularly published editorial cartoonist in the Dakotas, McDonald's cartoons explored a myriad of local, state, national and international issues. He won three George Washington Honor Medals from the Freedoms Foundation at Valley Forge. He also served two terms as a Republican in the North Dakota House of Representatives.
  
McDonald also spent time in Denver, Colorado, and Jamestown, North Dakota, before retiring in 2001.

McDonald now lives in Newburgh, Indiana where he does the political cartoons for the Evansville Courier & Press.

Bibliography
Dodds, David. Former Herald cartoonist donates his collection to UND.  Grand Forks Herald.  July 8, 2004.
The McDonald Book: A Collection of Editorial Cartoons by the Grand Forks Herald's Award Winning Cartoonist....  Grand Forks: Grand Forks Herald, 1963.

References

External links
 Stuart McDonald Papers at the University of North Dakota
 Stuart McDonald Cartoon Collection  Searchable collection of McDonald's cartoons from 1961 to 1968

Artists from North Dakota
People from Grand Forks, North Dakota
1931 births
Living people